Cryptacize is a California pop band founded by Nedelle Torrisi and Chris Cohen in 2006. They released two records on the Asthmatic Kitty label. 

After seeing percussionist Michael Carreira's solo cowbell videos on YouTube, Cohen and Torrisi asked him to join the band and they recorded their debut album Dig That Treasure (which was named after a musical written by Cohen's father in 1958). 

Cryptacize generated some controversy in 2008 with their cover of Steely Dan's Peg when some readers posted angry comments on Stereogum.

They toured the US many times, opening for bands such as Why?, Danielson, Sufjan Stevens, Ariel Pink's Haunted Graffiti, and The Fiery Furnaces.

Discography

Albums
 Dig That Treasure CD/LP (Asthmatic Kitty, 2007)
 Mythomania CD/LP (Asthmatic Kitty, 2009)

Singles
 split w/ Why? - Peg/As I Went Out One Morning (Asthmatic Kitty, 2008)
 Easy to Dream/Lost Beauties (Slowboy, 2009)

References

External links
Cryptacize official site
Cryptacize Blogspot
Cryptacize Myspace site
"Cosmic Sing-a-long" music video
Cryptacize Press Page
Asthmatic Kitty label website

2006 establishments in California
Asthmatic Kitty artists
Indie rock musical groups from California
Musical groups established in 2006
Musical groups from Oakland, California